Chrysler Hall is the premier performing arts venue in Norfolk, Virginia, located in the downtown section of the city.  Built in 1972 and located next to the Norfolk Scope arena, the venue is home to the Virginia Symphony Orchestra, the Virginia Ballet and hosts Broadway plays while serving as Norfolk's primary theater and concert venue.  The venue also contains a studio theater in the lower levels of the complex that serves as the current home of the Generic Theater. The City of Norfolk owns and operates the venue.

It was originally designed by Pier Luigi Nervi and local architects.

References

External links

 City of Norfolk's Seven Venues Official site
 Chrysler Hall

Buildings and structures in Norfolk, Virginia
Culture of Norfolk, Virginia
Theatres in Virginia
Tourist attractions in Norfolk, Virginia
Concert halls in the United States
1972 establishments in Virginia
Downtown Norfolk, Virginia
Pier Luigi Nervi buildings
Modernist architecture in Virginia
Theatres completed in 1972